The 1975–76 Shell Shield season was the tenth edition of what is now the Regional Four Day Competition, the domestic first-class cricket competition for the countries of the West Indies Cricket Board (WICB). The tournament was sponsored by Royal Dutch Shell, with matches played from 16 January to 13 February 1976.

Five teams contested the competition – Barbados, the Combined Islands, Guyana, Jamaica, and Trinidad and Tobago. Two teams, Barbados and Trinidad and Tobago,  finished equal on 20 points, and shared the title. The competition was marked by a large number of draws, with only two of the ten matches played to completion. Irvine Shillingford of the Combined Islands team was the leading run-scorer, while Trinidad and Tobago's Imtiaz Ali was the leading wicket-taker.

Points table

Key

 W – Outright win (12 points)
 L – Outright loss (0 points)
 LWF – Lost match, but won first innings (4 points)

 DWF – Drawn, but won first innings (6 points)
 DLF – Drawn, but lost first innings (2 points)
 A – Abandoned (0 points)

Statistics

Most runs
The top five run-scorers are included in this table, listed by runs scored and then by batting average.

Most wickets

The top five wicket-takers are listed in this table, listed by wickets taken and then by bowling average.

References

West Indian cricket seasons from 1970–71 to 1999–2000
1976 in West Indian cricket
Regional Four Day Competition seasons
Domestic cricket competitions in 1975–76